Daniel W. Hynes (born July 20, 1968) is an American politician, formerly serving as the Illinois Comptroller.

Background

Hynes was born in Chicago, the son of Thomas Hynes, a former Cook County assessor, president of the Illinois Senate and Democratic Ward committeeman of the 19th ward in Chicago, Illinois. He attended St. Ignatius College Prep in Chicago, where he graduated in 1986. 

Hynes later attended the University of Notre Dame, where he graduated magna cum laude in 1990 with a Bachelor of Science degree in economics and computer applications. He received his Juris Doctor degree with honors from Loyola University Chicago's School of Law in 1993. Daniel Hynes served as a health care attorney at the Chicago law firm of Hogan, Marren and McCahill, Ltd.

Hynes married Dr. Christina Kerger (M.D) in June 1999.

As Illinois Comptroller

Hynes was first elected Illinois Comptroller on November 3, 1998, at the age of 30. At the time, he was the youngest elected statewide constitutional officer in Illinois, since William Stratton was elected Treasurer of Illinois in 1942. Since first entering office in 1999, he was the first Comptroller to establish a "Rainy Day Fund" for Illinois as a way to secure funding for the state whenever there is a slowdown in revenue. 

Hynes also spearheaded bipartisan reform of laws governing the state's private cemeteries and funeral homes (which his office regulates) in 2001, the most extensive overhaul of these industries in 25 years.

Dan Hynes has sponsored new legislation that prohibited tax scofflaws from receiving state contracts. He also introduced legislation in 2003, that would do the same to corporations that have falsified their financial reports. Among his other measures as Comptroller, was to reform the Local Government Division of his office, increasing the percentage of compliance from Illinois's local government units in financial reporting from 65 to 95 percent. 

Hynes also expanded the office's commercial direct deposit program, encouraging state vendors to receive payments electronically, which saves taxpayer money and improves efficiency. Daniel Hynes was elected to a second term as Comptroller on November 5, 2002, with a margin of more than one million votes. He was elected to a third term in 2006, by a similarly large margin.

U.S. Senate campaign

In March 2004, Hynes was an unsuccessful candidate in the Democratic primary election, for his party's nomination for the United States Senate, finishing second to State Senator Barack Obama, who went on to win the general election in November. In September 2006, in an open letter published in the Chicago Sun-Times, Hynes endorsed drafting Obama into the presidential race of 2008. Hynes spoke on the first day of the 2008 Democratic National Convention in Denver, Colorado, lauding Obama.

2010 gubernatorial campaign

Hynes challenged Governor Pat Quinn for the Democratic nomination for Governor of Illinois, formally announcing his campaign on September 2, 2009. His campaign received the endorsement of former United States Senator Adlai E. Stevenson III. 

His newspaper endorsements included the Daily Herald, Kane County Chronicle, Northwest Herald, South Suburban News, Peoria Journal Star, The News-Gazette (Champaign-Urbana), The State Journal-Register (Springfield), and the Southtown Star. After a close vote, on February 4, 2010, Hynes conceded to Quinn and pledged his support to Quinn in the general election.

After politics
After leaving the Illinois Comptroller's office, Hynes joined Fort Myers, Florida based Foster & Foster Actuaries & Consultants. On January 19, 2012, it was reported that Hynes would be joining Ariel Investments, a Chicago investment management firm, as a senior vice president to aid in client services, marketing and business development. In 2015, Hynes moved to UBS Global Asset Management as head of Taft Hartley & large market public Chicago.

In 2016, Hynes was the sole superdelegate supporting former Maryland Governor Martin O'Malley. O'Malley dropped out after the Iowa Caucus in February, after failing to win any delegates, leaving Hillary Clinton and Bernie Sanders as the two remaining Democratic candidates, for the rest of the primary calendar.

In 2018, Dan Hynes was appointed by J.B. Pritzker as one of four Deputy Governors including Founding La Casa Norte Director Sol Flores, State Representative Christian Mitchell and Chicago Park District President Jesse Ruiz. He left the Pritzker Administration in 2021.

Electoral history
1998 Democratic Primary Election for Comptroller
Daniel Hynes (D), unopposed
1998 General Election for Comptroller
Daniel Hynes (D), 58.6%
Chris Lauzen (R), 39.6%
Houstoun McIntosh Sadler II (Reform), 1.7%
2002 Democratic Primary Election for Comptroller
Daniel Hynes (D) (inc.), unopposed
2002 General Election for Comptroller
Daniel Hynes (D) (inc.), 63.2%
Thomas Jefferson Ramsdell (R), 30.6%
Julie Fox (Libertarian), 4.2%
2004 Democratic Primary Election for U.S. Senate.
Barack Obama, 52.8%
Daniel Hynes, 23.7%
Blair Hull, 10.8%
Maria Pappas, 6.0%
Gery Chico, 4.3%
Nancy Skinner, 1.3%
Joyce Washington, 1.1%
2006 Democratic Primary Election for Comptroller
Daniel Hynes (D) (inc.),  unopposed
2006 General Election for Comptroller
Daniel Hynes (D) (inc.), 64.2%
Carole Pankau (R), 31.5%
Alicia Snyder (Green), 4.3%
2010 Democratic Primary Election for Governor
Pat Quinn (D) (inc.), 50.4%
Daniel Hynes (D), 49.6%

References

External links
Profile, votesmart.org; accessed January 18, 2017.
Follow the Money - Daniel W. Hynes
(2010 campaign contributions for Governor/Lt. Governor; pending)
(2008)
(2006) 
(2004) 
(2002) 
(2000) 
1998 (campaign contributions for Comptroller)

Dan Hynes interview with Elizabeth Brackett on WTTW, December 15, 2009.

Comptrollers of Illinois
Illinois Democrats
Politicians from Chicago
Living people
1968 births
Loyola University Chicago School of Law alumni
St. Ignatius College Prep alumni
University of Notre Dame alumni
Lawyers from Chicago